"Foolin' Yourself" is a single by the Canadian rock musician, Aldo Nova. Released on his eponymous debut album in 1982, the song climbed to #65 on the Billboard Hot 100 singles chart in the US.

1982 singles
Aldo Nova songs
1981 songs
Songs written by Aldo Nova
Portrait Records singles